The following buildings were added to the National Register of Historic Places as part of the Historic Winter Residences of Ormond Beach, 1878-1925 Multiple Property Submission (or MPS).

 Ormond Beach
National Register of Historic Places Multiple Property Submissions in Florida
Ormond Beach, Florida
National Register of Historic Places in Volusia County, Florida